West Cambridge is a university site to the west of Cambridge city centre in England. As part of the West Cambridge Master Plan, several of the University of Cambridge's departments have relocated to the West Cambridge site from the centre of town due to overcrowding. A number of other research institutions also have buildings on the site.

Layout 
The West Cambridge site covers the area between the M11 motorway, Madingley Road, Clerk Maxwell Road and the Coton Footpath. The area currently contains some open fields and a small lake. As well as number of university departments and private research institutions, the site also has residential areas and a restaurant. The roads on the site are named after famous Cambridge scientists. The Institute of Astronomy is located just to the north of the site, while the Centre for Mathematical Sciences is to the east.

Buildings

Future development 
Preparation for the construction of a new Cavendish laboratory (Cavendish III) has begun and it is expected to be completed by 2021/2022. Planning permission has also been granted for the construction of the Civil Engineering Building (CEB) due to be completed in spring 2019.

Conservation 
The West Cambridge site is also of conservation importance. The area is host to a number of native species, including barn owls, the grey partridge, badgers, grass snakes and various amphibians. RPS have been conducting surveys on the site since 2003. In order to preserve and develop habitats on the site, a number of ponds are maintained and the roofs of some buildings are covered with plants such as sedum. Landscape management is also employed to create and maintain hedgerows and ditches.

Archaeology 

An ancient Roman settlement dominates the archaeology of the site, but smaller, prehistoric and medieval use has also been documented. Investigations and excavations were conducted between 1999 and 2000, and the site was opened to the public as part of National Science Week and followed by a Schools' Week. During the investigations over 3000 excavations were made and around 50,000 finds retrieved. Some of these are on display in the William Gates Building.

Prehistoric activity 
A number of Stone Age flints and Iron Age pottery pits were discovered. Analysis is continuing into other possible prehistoric features.

Roman settlement 
A series of regular enclosures and semi-open Roman fields dominate the site. Also present were two timber buildings, some quarry pits and two cemeteries, featuring forty burials, plus five isolated burials. This settlement seems to be part of a much larger system that probably formed a ring around the Roman town. Current understanding suggests that the site was in use, in various stages, from the late 1st to early 5th centuries.

Some unusual features have also been documented, including a cache of 3rd-century coins and an enclosure containing butchered animal carcasses apparently for some ritualistic purpose. Deposits of horse and cattle remains mark the entrance of one of the cemeteries. Finds from this period include spearheads, brooches, coins, pottery and a copper bust of possibly Minerva or Pallas Athena.

Later use 
The site was abandoned in the 5th century AD, with no further activity until the late medieval period when ploughing began. A dyke was constructed known as Willowes Ditch, which is marked on 14th-century maps. No other development is apparent until the construction of Vicars Farm in the 19th century.

References

External links 

Interactive map of West Cambridge site with links to the departments

University of Cambridge sites